Juami River is a river of Amazonas state in north-western Brazil.

Juami River is a black water river, a tributary of the  white water Japurá River, and runs through the Amazon plain.
The entire basin of the Juami River is contained within the Juami-Japurá Ecological Station.

See also
List of rivers of Amazonas

References

Brazilian Ministry of Transport

Rivers of Amazonas (Brazilian state)